Undercliffe Cottage is a heritage-listed residence located at 50 Argyle Place, in the inner city Sydney suburb of Millers Point in the City of Sydney local government area of New South Wales, Australia. It is also known as Undercliff Cottage; and Grimes Cottage. The property was added to the New South Wales State Heritage Register on 2 April 1999.

History 
Millers Point is one of the earliest areas of European settlement in Australia, and a focus for maritime activities. Argyle Place, a primitive version of a London Square, was commenced by Governor Macquarie but not fully formed until after quarrying of the adjacent rock face had ceased in about 1865. The first owner of the cottage was mariner Captain George Grimes (1801-1854). Resumption plans of 1900 show the house as part of James Merriman's estate.

In 1958 architect John Fisher (member of the Institute of Architects, the Cumberland County Council Historic Buildings Committee and on the first Council of the National Trust of Australia (NSW) after its reformation in 1960), with the help of artist Cedric Flower, convinced Taubmans to paint the central bungalow at 50 Argyle Place. This drew attention to the importance of the Rocks for the first time. As a result, Fisher was able to negotiate leases for Bligh House (later Clydebank) and houses in Windmill Street for various medical societies.

It was first tenanted by the NSW Department of Housing in 1982. The house was sold by the Government of New South Wales in 2015 for 4.23 million.

Description 
 Colonial  Georgian style, four bedroom cottage with hipped slate roof continuous over verandah, and stuccoed walls. It is in good condition. This two storey (plus attic) building displays a symmetrical facade; it has large windows with stone sills at entry level (upper floor to street); cast iron balustrade, gate, columns and valance; and, an arched fan light above the front doorway. Storeys: 2 Construction: Stuccoed masonry walls, slate roof, rendered masonry chimney, cast iron verandah posts, frieze and balustrading. Painted timber joinery. Style: Late Georgian Orientation: Overlooking Argyle Place.

The external condition of the property is good.

Modifications and dates 
External: Watercolour (s) of house shows paired columns to verandah at entrance. Northern verandahs added between 1885 and 1900. Dormer windows at rear present in late 1850s photo. - Last inspected: 19 February 1995.

Heritage listing 
As at 23 November 2000, this  detached Georgian house, is an important streetscape element facing Argyle Place.

It is part of the Millers Point Conservation Area, an intact residential and maritime precinct. It contains residential buildings and civic spaces dating from the 1830s and is an important example of C19th adaptation of the landscape.

Undercliffe Cottage was listed on the New South Wales State Heritage Register on 2 April 1999.

See also 

Australian residential architectural styles
46-48 Argyle Place
Undercliffe Terrace, 52-60 Argyle Place

References

Bibliography

Attribution

External links
 

New South Wales State Heritage Register sites located in Millers Point
Houses in Millers Point, New South Wales
Articles incorporating text from the New South Wales State Heritage Register
1850 establishments in Australia
Houses completed in 1850
Millers Point Conservation Area
Victorian architecture in Sydney